Emil A. Rausch (11 September 1883 – 14 December 1954) was a German freestyle swimmer who competed in the 1904 Summer Olympics and 1906 Intercalated Games.

In the 1904 Olympics he won gold medals in the 880 yard freestyle and 1 mile freestyle and a bronze medal in the 220 yard freestyle. Two years later he won a silver medal as a member of German 4x250 m relay team and was fifth in 1 mile freestyle.

See also
 List of members of the International Swimming Hall of Fame

References

External links
 

1883 births
1955 deaths
German male swimmers
Olympic swimmers of Germany
Olympic bronze medalists for Germany
Olympic gold medalists for Germany
Olympic bronze medalists in swimming
Medalists at the 1904 Summer Olympics
Medalists at the 1906 Intercalated Games
Swimmers at the 1904 Summer Olympics
Swimmers at the 1906 Intercalated Games
Olympic gold medalists in swimming